The 2017 Torneo Internacional Challenger León will be a professional tennis tournament played on hard courts. It will be the fifteenth edition of the tournament which will be part of the 2017 ATP Challenger Tour. It will take place in León, Mexico between 28 March and 2 April 2017.

Singles main-draw entrants

Seeds

 1 Rankings are as of March 20, 2017.

Other entrants
The following players received wildcards into the singles main draw:
  Santiago González
  Hans Hach Verdugo
  Tigre Hank
  Manuel Sánchez

The following player received entry into the singles main draw as a special exempt:
  Denis Shapovalov

The following players received entry into the singles main draw as alternates:
  Nicolás Jarry
  Mackenzie McDonald

The following players received entry from the qualifying draw:
  Yannick Hanfmann
  Adrián Menéndez Maceiras
  Danilo Petrović
  Roberto Quiroz

The following player received entry as a lucky loser:
  Liam Broady

Champions

Singles

 Adrián Menéndez Maceiras def.  Roberto Quiroz 6–4, 3–6, 6–3.

Doubles

 Leander Paes /  Adil Shamasdin def.  Luca Margaroli /  Caio Zampieri 6–1, 6–4.

External links
Official Website

Torneo Internacional Challenger León
Torneo Internacional Challenger León
2017 in Mexican tennis